Statistics of Bahraini Premier League in the 1960–61 season.

Overview
Muharraq Club won the championship.

References
RSSSF

Bahraini Premier League seasons
Bah
1960–61 in Bahraini football